The Red Men Hall, later known as Century Hall, is a historic four-story building located in Reading, Pennsylvania.

Red Men
The building originally served as a meeting place for the local lodge or "wigwam" of the Improved Order of Red Men. The Red Men are a fraternal organization which imitate perceived Native American customs. However, this location consisted exclusively of German Americans. The organization had numerous chapters in Pennsylvania beginning in the nineteenth century.

Building
Constructed by the Red Men in 1900, the four-story brick facade building displays American Craftsman style architectural designs with Renaissance Revival elements, and includes decorative tiles by Henry Chapman Mercer. Later, the structure served as a rental hall called Century Hall, capitalizing on the building being built at the turn of the century.

The National Register of Historic Places added the structure in 2000. The building now consists of 15 low-income senior housing units.

See also
 Red Men Hall, for other buildings with the name in the United States
 GoggleWorks: Another Reading building designed by the Muhlenberg Brothers.
 National Register of Historic Places listings in Berks County, Pennsylvania

References

Improved Order of Red Men
Buildings and structures in Reading, Pennsylvania
Cultural infrastructure completed in 1900
Clubhouses on the National Register of Historic Places in Pennsylvania
American Craftsman architecture in Pennsylvania
National Register of Historic Places in Reading, Pennsylvania